Ayo Adesanya  (born 11 August 1969) is a Nigerian film actress, director and producer. Ayo Adesanya appears in both Yoruba and English-language films.

Early life
Ayo Adesanya hails from Ijagun, Ijebu in Ogun State southwestern Nigeria. Ayo Adesanya attended St Anne's School in Ibadan, the capital of Oyo State, where she completed both her primary and secondary school education and obtained both her First School Leaving Certificate and West African Senior School Certificate. She later proceeded to the University of Ibadan where she obtained a bachelor's degree in Mass communication.

Career
Ayo Adesanya began her career in 1986 after she completed the National Youth Service Scheme (NYSC)
In 1996, Ayo Adesanya joined the Nigerian movie industry (Nollywood) professionally and began her professional acting career and made her first appearance on television was on Tunji Bamishigbin's soap opera titled Palace. Ayo Adesanya later joined the Yoruba-language film industry, where she has featured, produced and directed several films. Ayo Adesanya also appears in English-language films.

Personal life
Ayo Adesanya was formerly married to Goriola Hassan but is now separated. Ayo Adesanya also has a son.

Selected filmography
Remember Your Mother (2000)
Dancer 2 ( 2001)
Tears in My Heart 2 (2006)

See also
 List of Nigerian film producers
 List of Yoruba people

References

1969 births
Living people
Actresses from Ogun State
Nigerian film producers
Yoruba actresses
Actresses in Yoruba cinema
University of Ibadan alumni
20th-century Nigerian actresses
21st-century Nigerian actresses
Nigerian film actresses
Nigerian film directors
Nigerian media personalities